The 2022 Miami Open was a professional hardcourt tennis tournament played from March 22 to April 3, 2022 on the grounds of Hard Rock Stadium in Miami Gardens, Florida. It was the 37th edition of the men's and women's event and was classified as an ATP Masters 1000 event on the 2022 ATP Tour and a WTA 1000 event on the 2022 WTA Tour.

Hubert Hurkacz and Ashleigh Barty were the defending champions in the men's and women's singles draw, respectively. However, Barty withdrew before the tournament began and later announced her retirement from professional tennis. Hurkacz lost in the semifinals to Carlos Alcaraz.

Champions

Men's singles 

  Carlos Alcaraz def.  Casper Ruud, 7–5, 6–4

This was Alcaraz's first ATP Tour Masters 1000 singles title.

Women's singles 

  Iga Świątek def.  Naomi Osaka, 6–4, 6–0

This was Świątek's sixth WTA Tour singles title, and third WTA 1000 title of the year. She became the fourth woman in history to win the Sunshine Double in singles, following her victory at Indian Wells a fortnight prior, and the youngest to do so. Świątek became the first woman in history to win the first three WTA 1000 titles of the year in succession, and the first player since Serena Williams in 2013 to win three consecutive WTA 1000 titles.

Men's doubles 

  Hubert Hurkacz /  John Isner def.  Wesley Koolhof /  Neal Skupski, 7–6(7–5), 6–4

Isner won the Sunshine Double in doubles, following his victory in Indian Wells two weeks previously.

Women's doubles 

  Laura Siegemund /  Vera Zvonareva def.  Veronika Kudermetova /  Elise Mertens, 7–6(7–3), 7–5.

Points and prize money

Point distribution

* Players with byes receive first round points.

Prize money
The prize money for the 2022 Miami Open is $9,554,920. All prize money is in US Dollars.

*

See also 

 2022 ATP Tour
 ATP Tour Masters 1000
 List of ATP Tour top-level tournament singles champions
 Tennis Masters Series records and statistics

 2022 WTA Tour
 WTA 1000 tournaments
 WTA Premier Mandatory/5
 List of WTA Tour top-level tournament singles champions

References

External links

 
2022
2022 ATP Tour
2022 WTA Tour
2022 in American tennis
March 2022 sports events in the United States
April 2022 sports events in the United States
2022 in sports in Florida